Brick Towers was a 324-unit affordable housing development in Newark, New Jersey, originally occupied in 1970.  The buildings were demolished in 2008, despite opposition by the City's Mayor Cory Booker, who was living in the property at the time.  Although the buildings were reported structurally sound, there were persistent problems with poor management and associated criminal activity. The site has been redeveloped.

See also
List of tallest buildings in Newark
440 Elizabeth Avenue

References 

Buildings and structures completed in 1969
Affordable housing
Cory Booker
Public housing in the United States
Buildings and structures in Newark, New Jersey
Demolished buildings and structures in New Jersey
Buildings and structures demolished in 2008
Apartment buildings in Newark, New Jersey
1969 establishments in New Jersey